This is a list of bridges and tunnels on the National Register of Historic Places (NRHP) in the U.S. state of Pennsylvania. Covered bridges on the NRHP in Pennsylvania are listed elsewhere.

Current listings

Former listings

External links
Historic Covered Bridges of Pennsylvania
Bedford County Pennsylvania Covered Bridges
"Pennsylvania Dutch" covered bridges

References

 
Pennsylvania
Bridges
Bridges